Heinrich Bedford-Strohm (born 30 March 1960 in Memmingen) is a German Lutheran bishop.

Life 
His father was a Lutheran priest in Memmingen. Bedford-Strohm studied Lutheran theology at Erlangen, Heidelberg and Berkeley. In 1997, he became a pastor. From 2004 until 2011, he worked at the University of Bamberg. In 2011, he became bishop of the Evangelical Lutheran Church in Bavaria. Since 2014, he is the chairman of the council of Evangelical Church in Germany, succeeding Nikolaus Schneider.

In 1985, he married Deborah Bedford and they had three sons.

Works 
 Vorrang für die Armen. Auf dem Weg zu einer theologischen Theorie der Gerechtigkeit. Gütersloher Verlags-Haus, Gütersloh 1993, . (Heidelberg, Universität, Dissertation, 1992).
 Gemeinschaft aus kommunikativer Freiheit. Sozialer Zusammenhalt in der modernen Gesellschaft. Ein theologischer Beitrag. Gütersloher Verlags-Haus, Gütersloh 1999, . (Zugleich: Heidelberg, Universität, Habilitations-Schrift, 1998).
 Schöpfung (Ökumenische Studienhefte 12). Göttingen 2001.
 Position beziehen. Perspektiven einer öffentlichen Theologie, Munich 2012, 
 Leben dürfen – Leben müssen. Argumente gegen die Sterbehilfe, Munich 2015, .
 Funkenflug. Glaube neu entfacht. adeo, Aßlar 2015, .
 mit-ge-fühl. Ein Plädoyer, Munich 2016
 Alles ändert sich. Die Welt im Licht von Weihnachten. Patmos, Ostfildern, 2016, .

Awards 
 2015: Hans Ehrenberg Award
 2016: Herbert Haag Award
 2017: Bavarian Order of Merit
 2019: Oswald von Nell-Breuning Award

References

External links 
 EKD.de: Heinrich Bedford-Strohm (German)
 
 Inhaber 2004–2011 Lehrstuhl für Evangelische Theologie (Systematische Theologie und theologische Gegenwartsfragen) University Bamberg
  Evangelical Lutheran Church in Bavaria: Heinrich Bedford-Strohm
 Website by Evangelical Lutheran Church in Bavaria: Heinrich Bedford-Strohm
 Dietrich-Bonhoeffer-Forschungsstelle für Öffentliche Theologie 

21st-century German Lutheran bishops
German Lutheran theologians
1960 births
People from Memmingen
Presidents of the Council of the Evangelical Church in Germany
Academic staff of the University of Bamberg
Living people